Murray Barton Taylor (born 25 August 1956) is a retired rugby union player from New Zealand. He played thirty matches for the All Blacks in the late 1970s and early 1980s; seven of these were test matches. He is now living in the Waikato in New Zealand.

References

1956 births
Living people
Rugby union players from Hamilton, New Zealand
People educated at Matamata College
New Zealand international rugby union players
New Zealand rugby union players
Waikato rugby union players
Rugby union fly-halves